Krautrock (also called , German for ) is a broad genre of experimental rock that developed in West Germany in the late 1960s and early 1970s. It originated among artists who blended elements of psychedelic rock, avant-garde composition, and electronic music, among other eclectic sources. Common elements included hypnotic rhythms, extended improvisation, musique concrète techniques, and early synthesizers, while the music generally moved away from the rhythm & blues roots and song structure found in traditional Anglo-American rock music. Prominent groups associated with the krautrock label included Neu!, Can, Faust, Tangerine Dream, Kraftwerk, Cluster, Ash Ra Tempel, Popol Vuh, Amon Düül II and Harmonia.

The term "krautrock" was popularized by British music journalists as a humorous umbrella-label for the diverse German scene, though many so-labeled artists disliked the term. The movement was partly born out of the radical student protests of 1968, as German youth rebelled against their country's legacy in World War II and sought a popular music distinct from traditional German music and American pop. The period contributed to the development of ambient music and techno, and influenced subsequent genres such as post-punk, new-age music, and post-rock.

Characteristics 
Krautrock has been described as a broad genre encompassing varied approaches, but commonly drawing on  psychedelia, avant-garde collage, electronic sounds, and rock music, while typically featuring "improvisation and hypnotic, minimalistic rhythms."  Los Angeles Magazine summarized the genre as "American psychedelica meets icy Germanic detachment." Melody Maker described the style as "where the over-reaching ambition and untethered freakitude of late '60s acid rock is checked and galvanised by a proto-punk minimalism ... music of immense scale that miraculously avoided prog-rock's bombastics.” AllMusic described it as expanding on the territory associated with art rock and progressive rock, but diverging from the American and British groups' emphasis on jazz and classical elements in favor of "a droning, pulsating sound that owed more to the avant garde than to rock & roll."

Some common musical features exhibited by krautrock artists include:

 A blend of elements from psychedelic rock with electronic music or avant-garde sources
 Hypnotic or minimalistic rhythms, including the common 4/4 "motorik" beat pattern
 Emphasis on long-form repetition, texture, and drone elements rather than song structure
 Use of synthesizers and musique concrète techniques
 A movement away from rock's traditional rhythm & blues roots
 Extended improvisation

Despite a common approach and generational attitude among artists, the New Statesman argues that "in truth, no two Krautrock acts sound remotely alike. Compare the dreamy synthesiser washes of Tangerine Dream with the alien noise collages of Faust or the psychedelic funk of Can." However, a common feature is the "motorik" beat: the 4/4 beat often used by drummers associated with krautrock, characterised by a kick drum-heavy, pulsating groove, that created a forward-flowing feel. The motorik beat was used by Can in the song "Mother Sky", by Neu! on their debut album, and by Kraftwerk in the song "Autobahn" on their album of the same name, later being adopted by other krautrock bands. It has been widely used in many different styles of music beyond krautrock. According to XLR8R, the term krautrock is often used by critics to signify the "mesmerizing motorik rhythms pioneered by Can and Neu!", but contested that "they represent merely a tiny fraction of the music that emerged from Germany during krautrock's Golden Age".

Origins and influences

Krautrock emerged in West Germany during the 1960s and early 1970s. The music was partially inspired by broad cultural developments such as the revolutionary 1968 German student movement, with many young people having both political and aesthetic concerns. Youth rebelled against both dominant American influence and conservative German entertainment such as schlager music, seeking to liberate themselves from Germany's Nazi legacy in World War II and create a new popular culture. Dieter Moebius, of the bands Cluster and Harmonia, noted that "we were a lot of the times on the streets instead of studying. As young people we were not very proud to be German [...] we were all tired of listening to bad German music and imitations of American music. Something had to happen." The movement saw artists merge elements of varied genres such as psychedelic rock, avant-garde forms of electronic music, funk rhythm, jazz improvisation and "ethnic" music styles, typically reflecting a "genuine sense of awe and wonder."

Core influences on these German artists included avant-garde composers Karlheinz Stockhausen and Terry Riley, and bands such as the Mothers of Invention, the Velvet Underground, the Beatles, and Pink Floyd. A significant influence was the work of American minimalists such as Riley, Tony Conrad, and La Monte Young, as well as the late '60s albums of jazz musician Miles Davis, particularly his jazz fusion work on In a Silent Way (1969). Some artists drew on ideas from 20th century classical music and musique concrète, particularly composer Stockhausen (with whom, for example, Irmin Schmidt and Holger Czukay of Can had previously studied), and from the new experimental directions that emerged in jazz during the 1960s and 1970s (mainly the free jazz pieces by Ornette Coleman or Albert Ayler). The Quietus noted the influence of Jimi Hendrix and James Brown on krautrock musicians. Moving away from the patterns of song structure and melody of much rock music in America and Britain, some in the movement were drawn to a more mechanical and electronic sound.

Etymology
Until around 1973, the word  ("German Rock") was used to refer to the new groups from West Germany.  Other names thrown around by the British and American music press were "Teutonic rock", "Überrock" and "Götterdämmer rock". West Germany's music press initially used  as a pejorative, but the term lost its stigma after the music gained success in Britain.  The term derives from the ethnic slur "kraut". "Kraut" in German can refer to herbs, weeds, and drugs.

Various sources claim that "krautrock" was originally a humorous term coined in the early 1970s, either by British disc jockey John Peel or by the UK music newspaper Melody Maker, in which experimental German bands found an early and enthusiastic following. The first use of the term however, was found in a full-page advertisement from Popo Music Management and Bacillus Records promoting German Rock in the UK, in April 1971. The music emerging in Germany was first covered extensively in three concurrent issues of the UK music paper New Musical Express in the month of December 1972, by journalist Ian MacDonald.

Its musicians tended to reject the name "krautrock". This was also the case for "kosmische Musik". Musicologist Julian Cope, in his book Krautrocksampler, says "krautrock is a subjective British phenomenon", based on the way the music was received in the UK rather than on the actual West German music scene out of which it grew. For instance, while one of the main groups originally tagged as krautrock, Faust, recorded a seminal 12-minute track they titled "Krautrock", they would later distance themselves from the term, saying: "When the English people started talking about krautrock, we thought they were just taking the piss... and when you hear the so-called 'krautrock renaissance', it makes me think everything we did was for nothing."

Kosmische musik 

Kosmische musik ("cosmic music") is a term which came into regular use before "krautrock" and was preferred by some German artists who disliked the English label; today, it is often used synonymously with krautrock. More specifically, it may describe 1970s German electronic music which uses synthesizers and incorporates themes related to space or otherworldliness; it is also used as a German analogue to the English term "space rock". The style was often instrumental and characterized by "spacy", ambient soundscapes. Artists used synthesizers such as the EMS VCS 3 and Moog Modular, as well as sound processing effects and tape-based approaches. They largely rejected rock music conventions, and instead drew on "serious" electronic compositions.

The term "kosmische musik" was coined by Edgar Froese and later used by record producer Rolf-Ulrich Kaiser as a marketing name for bands such as Ash Ra Tempel, Tangerine Dream, and Klaus Schulze. The following year, Rolf-Ulrich Kaiser's Ohr Records when he released the compilation Kosmische Musik (1972) featuring tracks by Tangerine Dream, Klaus Schulze, Ash Ra Tempel, and Popol Vuh. Kaiser eventually began referring to the style as "cosmic rock" to signify that the music belonged in a rock idiom. German producer Conny Plank was a central figure in the kosmische sound, emphasizing texture, effects processing, and tape-based editing techniques. Plank oversaw kosmische recordings such as Kraftwerk's Autobahn, Neu!'s Neu! 75, and Cluster's Zuckerzeit.

Several of these artists would later distance themselves from the term. Other names for the style, and for sub-genres were "Berlin School" and "Dusseldorf School", both of which are recognised and actively contributed to by artists such as Node, Martin Sturtzer, Propaganda, Kraftwerk, Tannheuser and Fritz Mayr, from the 1980s through to the present day. The style would later lead to the development of new-age music, with which it shared several characteristics. It would also exert lasting influence on subsequent electronic music and avant-garde rock.

Legacy and influence

Krautrock has proved to be highly influential on a succession of other musical styles and developments. Early contemporary enthusiasts outside Germany included Hawkwind and in particular Dave Brock who supposedly penned the sleeve notes for the British edition of Neu!'s first album. Faust's budget release The Faust Tapes has been cited as a formative teenage influence by several musicians growing up in the early 1970s such as Julian Cope, who has always cited krautrock as an influence, and wrote the book Krautrocksampler on the subject. The genre also had a strong influence on David Bowie's Station to Station (1976) and the experimentation it inspired led to his 'Berlin Trilogy'.

Ash Ra Tempel's first album, released in 1971, informed later krautrock music.

Kosmischer Läufer, a Scottish-German music project with its first installment launched in 2013, presents itself as a music collection supposedly used by East German athletes in their training. The music bears excessive inspiration and techniques of the Krautrock genre.

See also

References
Citations

Bibliography

External links 
Krautrock @ pHinnWeb
krautrock website
Krautrocksite – online magazine from Germany

 
20th-century music genres
Music scenes
Electronic rock
Electronic music genres
Rock music genres
German styles of music
1970s neologisms
1960s in music